Delias aroae is a butterfly in the family Pieridae. It was described by Carl Ribbe in 1900. It is found in New Guinea (Aroa River).

The wingspan is about 38 mm.

Subspecies
Delias aroae aroae (Central Highlands, West Papua to Papua New Guinea) 
Delias aroae yabensis Joicey & Talbot, 1922 (Weyland Mounts, Baliem Valley)

References

External links
Delias at Markku Savela's Lepidoptera and Some Other Life Forms

aroae
Butterflies described in 1900